Hawzen (Tigrinya: ሓውዜን) is a town in northern Ethiopia. Its market day is Wednesday. It is the largest settlement in Hawzen woreda.

History

Origins 
Tradition states that Hawzen was founded by the Sadqan, a group of Christian missionaries who traveled to the Aksumite Kingdom during the reign of Kaleb of Aksum. Four ancient stelae, similar to the Gudit Stelae outside Axum, can be found in the marketplace. The Church of Hawzen Tekle Haymanot, although a modern structure, encloses "a small rock-hewn church thought to be one of the oldest in Tigray based on the finely carved capital and column".

19th Century 
On 8 March 1892, Dejazmach Sebhat Aregawi submitted to Ras Mangesha Yohannes at Hawzen by ceremonially carrying a stone upon his neck before Ras Mangesha as the other Rases of Tigray and Ichege Tewoflos watched; Ras Mangesha then pardoned the Dejazmach. By March 1895, after the town of Adigrat was occupied by the advancing Italian army, Ras Mangesha assembled about 4,000 men at the town  of Hawzen for an attack on Adigrat. Italian General Oreste Baratieri reacted by gathering 3,144 soldiers near Senafe, then marched to the support of the Italian-appointed governor, Ras Hagos Tafari. When Baratieri entered Adigrat on 25 March, Mangesha withdrew into the Tigray interior.

20th Century 
In 1938, there was a shop, a post, telephone and telegraph office, a fountain, a health post and a technical school.  The important market was also mentioned.

Air raids during the civil war of the 1980s
During the Ethiopian Civil War, Hawzen was bombed frequently from the air by the Ethiopian National Defence Forces:
 March-June 1988: 9 attacks, casualties not known
 22 June 1988: Hawzen massacre
On 22 June 1988 Hawzen was the target of one of the more brutal acts of the Derg against their opponents during the Ethiopian Civil War: upwards of 2,500 people were killed when the Ethiopian Air Force bombed the town marketplace. Four ancient stele were toppled in the same bombardment. The parties and factors involved in the culmination of this air raid is yet to be revealed. The Tigray People's Liberation Front's cameras were positioned to capture the air raid from different angles, as is evidenced by the video released soon after the event. TPLF cameras captured the attack as it happened, and afterwards, went onto the ground recording, in graphic detail, the results of the air raid. Ethiopia's public opinion differs as to the role played by TPLF in the creation of this event. Former TPLF leader Aregawi Berhe claims the attack was made at the direction, or at least tacit permission, of Legesse Asfaw, who had been appointed Chief Martial Law Administrator for Tigray the previous month. A memorial currently stands to commemorate the dead.

Demographics 
In 1938, the town counted 2471 inhabitants.

Based on figures from the Central Statistical Agency in 2005, Hawzen has an estimated total population of 5,638 of whom 2,616 are men and 3,022 are women. The 1994 census reported it had a total population of 3,250 of whom 1,393 were men and 1,857 were women.

Notes 

 
Populated places in the Tigray Region